The Red Sea is an EP by Isis. An expansion of the sound pioneered on their previous release Mosquito Control, this EP offers a slight evolution toward the direction Isis would begin to take with their first full length, Celestial. The three songs which make up the original EP (tracks 1–3) are tied together with spoken word samples from the short-lived television series Hotel Room (specifically, the third episode, entitled "Blackout"). The song "Ochre" contains a sample from the film Dead Man by Jim Jarmusch, and is a reading of a portion of William Blake's poem "Auguries of Innocence".

The album was first released on CD and 8" vinyl. The CD (and later 12") versions of The Red Sea contain the four songs that made up Isis' 1998 cassette demo (as bonus tracks); electronics are by former member Chris Mereschuk on those songs.

This is the first release with Jay Randall (Agoraphobic Nosebleed) on electronics and backing vocals (he also appeared on Isis' cover of "Streetcleaner", originally by Godflesh). Jay would leave the band after its release, and was replaced by Bryant Clifford Meyer, who stayed with Isis until their dissolution in 2010. The Red Sea was also the first release to feature Michael Gallagher, who would also stay with Isis until their end.

The Red Sea also introduces water as a key theme in Isis' albums that would be expanded upon later with (Oceanic).

"Charmicarmicarmicat" is a reference to the Melvins song "Charmicarmicat" (from the 1991 EP Eggnog), with an extra "carmi" added to poke fun at the general ridiculousness of the Melvins' sense of humor. This is seemingly confirmed in the liner notes, which thank "Earth, Bastard Noise and The Melvins for inspiration for track one."

Reception

Aaron Turner has expressed a degree of dissatisfaction with the final product, stating that Isis were “wrestling with a number of different ideas”, and that he personally “was trying to force a level of technicality in some of the guitar parts, especially in 'The Minus Times', which ended up detracting from the overall power of the songs.” He has, however, shown fondness for the title track, and posited that despite “whatever shortcomings this record has, it’s one of the darkest things we ever recorded in terms of atmosphere, production and composition.”

In reviewing the album, Allmusic's William York stated that The Red Sea “shows off a few different facets of the band's hardcore/doom/sludge/metal style, which at this stage was already pretty impressive despite not yet having fully developed to the point it would on subsequent efforts.” He continues to say that although it “feels a little bit more like them 'doing their homework' than a later album like Celestial does, it still outshines the work of many of their peers.”

Track listing

Personnel

Band members
 Aaron Turner (vocals & guitar)
 Jeff Caxide (bass)
 Aaron Harris (drums)
 Michael Gallagher (guitar; tracks 1-3, 8)
 Jay Randall (electronics; tracks 1-3, 8)
 Chris Mereschuk (electronics; tracks 4-7)

Additional personnel
 G. Mortillaro – photography
 J. Hellmann – photography
 Kurt Ballou – audio recording and production (tracks 1–3, 8)
 Mike Hill – audio recording and production (tracks 4–7)
 Dave Merullo – mastering

References

External links 
 The Red Sea at Bandcamp (streamed copy where licensed)

Concept albums
1999 EPs
Isis (band) albums
Albums with cover art by Aaron Turner
Albums produced by Kurt Ballou